USS Cherokee  was a tugboat built in 1891 by John H. Dialogue & Sons in Camden, New Jersey, as Edgar F. Luckenbach (later renamed Luckenbach No. 2). The ship was purchased by the United States Navy and delivered at New York on 12 October 1917; and commissioned on 5 December 1917. She was renamed Cherokee, the third US Navy ship of that name, after the Cherokee Native American tribe, and given the identification number 458.
 
Outfitted for distant service at New York and at the Philadelphia Navy Yard, Cherokee cleared Newport, Rhode Island on 24 February 1918 for Washington, D.C. On 26 February, in a heavy gale, she foundered about 12 miles off Fenwick Island Light Vessel, with the loss of 30 of her crew. The tanker British Admiral rescued 12 survivors, two of whom died before the tanker reached port.

References

External links
Luckenbach Number 2 (American Tug, 1891)
New Jersey Scuba Diver
Divesafety Cherokee page

Tugs of the United States Navy
World War I auxiliary ships of the United States
Ships built by Dialogue & Company
1891 ships
Shipwrecks of the Delaware coast
Maritime incidents in 1918